Raja Jagat Singh was a Rajput soldier and ruler of the Nurpur kingdom.

Folklore
In 1630 Jagat Singh sided with his people of Nurpur, who were starving during the famine and paid taxes from his own pocket. A lack of rain for three years caused the Deccan famine of 1630–32. It affected the Gujarat, Malwa, and Deccan regions while the Mughals carried out a war campaign. While the entire province lay dead, Shah Jahan's war camp was “fair and spacious, plentifully stored with all provisions, being supplied with all things from all parts, far and near”. While people in the entire province were dying due to famine caused by his own army, Shah Jahan was collecting money to build the Taj Mahal, the construction of which began on 1632. Taxes in the Mughal Empire were among the highest in the world; according to the estimates of J.N.U scholar Shireen Moosvi, Mughals took 56.7% of total produce from peasants. Where the state's revenue needed to be used to quell the famine, Shah Jahan used it to build the Taj Mahal. According to contemporary sources like the letter written by a Dutch East India Company lawyer, the famine led to 7.4 million deaths. In contrast to Mughal tax regime of 1632, Hindu kings like Raja Jagat Singh and Raja of Bundelkhand took one-sixth (16.6%) as laid out in the Hindu scriptures. They rebelled to prevent further famines. The Bundelkhand rebellion by Jhujhar Singh was stopped in 1635 but Jagat Singh foughtuntil 1642, when the Taj Mahal was completed and no more additional funds were needed.

References

External links 

1575 births
1646 deaths
17th-century Indian monarchs
History of Himachal Pradesh
Rajput rulers